A skip (or skip bin) is a large open-topped waste container designed for loading onto a special type of lorry. Typically skip bins have a distinctive shape: the longitudinal cross-section of the skip bin is either a trapezium or two stacked trapezia. The lower trapezium has the smaller edge at the bottom of the skip bin, and a longer edge at the top. The smaller edge on either end is lower which makes it easier to load. Where there is an upper trapezium, it has the smaller edge at the top. There is a sloping floor or wall at each end. There are usually two lugs on each side of the bin onto which chains can be attached, permitting the heavy skip bin to be lifted onto and off a skip lorry or skip truck. A special skip-carrying lorry or crane is used.

One end of the skip sometimes has a large door that hinges down to allow manual loading and unloading, these skips are called 'drop-door skips'. Skips are usually durable and tough, made to withstand rough use by tradespeople and labourers. The size of skip bins can vary greatly depending on their use, with sizes ranging from small 2 m mini-skips to the very large 40 m roll-on/roll-off skips. Even though these large bins can store many tonnes of waste, most lorries are limited to carrying around 7.5 tonnes of material in the container.

A typical small skip, when empty, weighs about 187kg.

Types
There are several types of skip containers:
 Open skips allow easier loading of waste materials and are commonly found on construction sites.
 Closed skips are more secure and prevent unauthorised use. They ensure that the volume of waste does not exceed the maximum limit.
 Roll-on/roll-off (RORO) skips are similar to open skips, but instead of being lifted onto a skip loader wagon by chains, they are rolled onto a wagon with a hook. They are more common as industrial containers and are not suitable for domestic use (see: roll-off).
 Mobile skip bins are usually set on a trailer with four wheels. A lifting mechanism is used to load and unload the skip from the trailer. Normal sizes used in Australia are 3 m3, 4 m3, and 6 m3. However, sizes ranging from 8 m3, 10 m3, and 12 m3 are also available for larger waste management jobs.

Uses

Skips are commonly used to hold open-topped loads of construction and demolition waste, garden waste or other waste and litter types. The construction debris may originate from a building, renovation, or demolition site; building supplies can be delivered to a site in a skip that is later used to remove waste. Skips are also used for various cleaning-out jobs that need much material to be taken away, and at factories producing large quantities of scrap metal. The material in the skip may be taken to a landfill, recycled or recovered/disposed of in some other way. There are wide range of uses of skip bins including construction building, home renovations, handyman maintenance or repair projects, garden or green clean up.

Skip hire companies typically print 'level fill' on the sides of skips to instruct users that the contents should not fill or have contents showing above the height of the sides of the skip. This is in part for safety so that contents do not fall out posing a risk to passers-by, and is also aimed at maximising revenue for the skip hire company. Many tradesmen and builders will make use of what are termed 'greedy boards', old doors and other scrap sheet based material, to artificially heighten the sides of the skip and thus get more value for money for tradesmen or builders. If they do that, the skip bin hire provider will charge them an extra fee as the skip will be overloaded.

Domestic skip sizes and uses
2 m – miniature skip 
 Approximately 25-35 black bin bags
 Perfect for small kitchen refurbishment 
 Economical choice for garden/household waste
 Fits on most drives and gardens

4 m – medium skip  
3 m3
 Approximately 45-55 black bin bags
 Perfect for small kitchen refurbishment 
 Economical choice for garden/household waste
 Fits on most drives and gardens

6 m – builders skip
5 m3
 Approximately 60-70 black bin bags
 Perfect for refurbishment projects
 Ideal for house/attic clearances
 Fits approximately 6 tonnes of soil and stone or hardcore

8 m – large builders skip
6 m3
 80-90 black bin bags
 Size of large family car
 Ideal for all construction jobs or large hour or garage clear-outs

Prohibited waste

 Asbestos
 Human or animal waste
 Hazardous liquids, such as oil, paint or pesticides
 Tyres, as they are difficult for the waste company to process and should instead be taken to a tyre recycler.
 Batteries
 Gas bottles
 Electronic waste: CRTs, TVs, monitors, etc.
 Fluorescent tubes
 Food waste

Refrigerators and other white goods can be put in skip bins, as long as they have been degassed and the doors are removed. However it is better to take white goods to a dedicated recycling facility, as they take up significant room in a skip bin.

Plasterboard is also prohibited, as it can contaminate the entire contents of the skip. Sometimes, with permission, small quantities of plasterboard are permitted by skip hire companies if placed on top of the skip and wrapped to prevent contamination.

In the event that the waste management company discovers prohibited waste in a skip bin that has been collected, the bin may be taken back to the customer for them to sort out the waste, or the hazardous waste may be disposed off at a different, specialist site at the cost of the customer.

Etymology
The origins of calling a rubbish cart a skip (most often found in Australia, New Zealand and the UK) come from the word , used to refer to a basket. Skep itself comes from the Late Old English , from the Old Norse  'basket'. While the first recorded use of a rubbish skip dates back to 1922, the practice of using skips to dispose of residential and commercial waste became mainstream over the following century, culminating in the modern skip waste disposal system that is used today.

See also
Shipping container
 Waste container (dustbin, etc)
Waste management
Skip wagon, a train car

References

Waste containers